Palgi (also Romanized as Palgī and Polagī; also known as Polakī) is a village in Qorqori Rural District, Qorqori District, Hirmand County, Sistan and Baluchestan Province, Iran. At the 2006 census, its population was 151, in 37 families.

References 

Populated places in Hirmand County